T4 Topkapı - Mescid-i Selam tram line is a light rail line in Istanbul, Turkey, operated by Istanbul Ulaşım AŞ. The T4 line operates its own right-of-way in a street median for most of its route, though with a few at-grade crossings, thus technically making it light rail though the operator Metro Istanbul categorizes it as a tramline.

The first section of the T4 line opened between Edirnekapı and Mescid-i Selam on 12 September 2007. An extension southwest of Edirnekapı to Topkapı was opened on 18 March 2009.

Connections to the M1 line are available at Vatan station, while connections to the T1 tram line and the Istanbul Metrobus are available at Topkapı station.

Stations

Rolling Stock 
(pictures needed)

ABB 
For a brief period of time, bulky high-floor ABB LRVs (similar to ones used in M1) were used. After additional rolling stock was added however these trains were moved to operate on the M1 line.

Duewag 
These are old B80S and B100S sets that were used on Cologne Stadtbahn and purchased in 2007. They were used on both T1 and T4 lines (but the ex-T2 line also) and with the arrival of Alstom Citadis trams, on the T1 line they began to operate on the T4 line only.

Hyundai Rotem LRV34 
From 2008, 63 units. Same vehicles used in on the Adana Metro and very similar to the LRTA 1100 class in Manila, Philippines.

RTE 
More recently (from 2014) new high-floor trams that were constructed by Metro Istanbul (the operator) itself are also used. During its development, there were intermediate models (RTE 2000 and RTE 2009) that operated on the line.

See also
 Istanbul Tram
 Istanbul Metro
 Istanbul nostalgic tramways
 Public transport in Istanbul

References

Railway lines opened in 2007
Tram transport in Istanbul
Fatih
Eyüp
Gaziosmanpaşa
750 V DC railway electrification